The 1960 Fresno State Bulldogs football team represented Fresno State College—now known as California State University, Fresno—as a member of the California Collegiate Athletic Association (CCAA) during the 1960 NCAA College Division football season. Led by second-year head coach Cecil Coleman, Fresno State compiled an overall record of 9–1 with a mark of 5–0 in conference play, winning the CCAA title for the third consecutive year. The Bulldogs played home games at Ratcliffe Stadium on the campus of Fresno City College in Fresno, California.

Schedule

Team players in the NFL/AFL
The following were selected in the 1961 NFL Draft.

The following were selected in the 1961 AFL Draft.

The following finished their college career in 1960, were not drafted, but played in the AFL (prior to the merge with the NFL).

Notes

References

Fresno State
Fresno State Bulldogs football seasons
California Collegiate Athletic Association football champion seasons
Fresno State Bulldogs football